Daniel Vivian (born 1963) is a British actor of Serbian origin. He works internationally.

Biography

Early life and career

Daniel Vivian began acting with Bosnian film director Pjer Zalica in experimental short films. He later appeared in a one-man show which he took to the Edinburgh Fringe Festival.

Screen and stage work

His debut was as one of the Russian thugs in John Landis' Blues Brothers 2000, followed by X-Men. His first American TV appearance was in CBS' Falcone as an Ahmed Alia. He was cast as Vinnie, the brutal mercenary, in cult film War Games: At the End of the Day by Cosimo Alemà, shot on the location in Italy. Then, he played Dragan Ilic in Zombie Massacre, a horror film based on the video game, followed by his debut on Italian TV in Un passo dal cielo, as guest star, playing the Russian mastermind Nikolaj Yelisev. Vivian co-produced an indie feature film called Evidence of Existence, playing a thoughtful mobster, Manon. In 2013 he narrated the documentary Smash & Grab by award winning British director Havana Marking. In the following year he appeared in two feature films: The Perfect Husband and Morning Star. He has worked with director Gabriele Salvatores twice; first in Il ragazzo invisibile-Seconda generazione and then in Volare.  In Paolo Sorrentino's The Young Pope and The New Pope, he plays Domen, the Pope's butler.

Filmography

References

External links

Daniel Vivian Official Site
Matt J Horn
Gorilla film magazine blog
Variety - Smash & Grab

1963 births
Living people
British male film actors
British male stage actors
Bosnia and Herzegovina emigrants to the United Kingdom
British people of Serbian descent
Serbs of Bosnia and Herzegovina
People from Foča